Benham Bank is an ocean bank in the Philippine Sea. It is the shallowest point of Benham Rise, which is wholly part of the territory of the Philippines.

Geology

Flora and fauna
Benham Bank hosts at least 200 species of fish, including commercially important fish such as the blue fin tuna. Expeditions in 2014 and 2016 revealed a mesophotic coral reef with 100% live coral cover.

Research
Marine scientists from the Bureau of Fisheries and Aquatic Resources (BFAR) and the University of the Philippines (UP) conducted research in the Benham Bank in 2016. They boarded the government ship MV DA-BFAR for their research. Their remotely operated vehicle as well as technical diver-videographers were provided by Oceana Philippines. BFAR and UP also conducted research in 2014.

Conservation
Local environmental groups have urged the Department of Environment and Natural Resources to declare the Benham Bank as a "no-take" zone to legally protect the feature's biodiversity by limiting "human activity".

References

Landforms of the Philippines
Philippine Sea
Undersea banks of the Pacific Ocean